The Pointe-Claire Windmill (French: Moulin à vent de Pointe-Claire) is a windmill in Pointe-Claire, Quebec, Canada. It is the oldest windmill on the island of Montreal and one of 18 remaining windmills in Quebec.

Like most mills in New France it was built to a French design, a cylindrical stone tower with a movable roof which could be turned by a tail pole to face the sails to the wind. The mill had two doors, to provide an exit regardless of which ways the sails faced. The walls are four French feet (1m32) thick at the base. The interior is 12 French feet in diameter by 24 high. The mill originally contained elevated platforms beneath gun slits for defence. The surrounding shoreline was fenced with pointed wooden stakes. However, the site was never attacked.

Chronology
 1709: construction began in spring for the Society of Saint-Sulpice by stone mason Jean Mars, and Léonard Paillé dit Paillard and his son Charles for other parts of the construction.
 1710: construction complete in the autumn, including a small wooden house for the miller.
 1824: major renovation
 1837: sold to Amable de Saint-Julien, farmer at Rigaud
 1866: sold to the Fabrique de Saint-Joachim-de-la-Pointe-Claire
 1866: sold to the Congregation of Notre Dame of Montreal
 1885 (approximately): new sails
 1954: restoration, conical roof
 1967: new sails
 1983: classified a monument of Quebec.

References

External links
Society for the preservation of the Heritage of Pointe-Claire webpage

Buildings and structures in Pointe-Claire
Windmills in Canada
Industrial buildings completed in 1710
Heritage buildings of Quebec
1710 establishments in the French colonial empire